Streptomyces iconiensis is a halotolerant bacterium species from the genus of Streptomyces which has been isolated from soil from a salt lake in Konya in Turkey.

See also 
 List of Streptomyces species

References

Further reading

External links
Type strain of Streptomyces iconiensis at BacDive -  the Bacterial Diversity Metadatabase

iconiensis
Bacteria described in 2014